Carolina Isakson Proctor (born Mary Caroline Isakson; January 6, 1930 – January 14, 2012) was an American artist and First Lady of Colombia from 1986 to 1990. She married Colombia's future president Virgilio Barco in 1950.

During her husband's administration, she helped to create, and then directed, a national anti-poverty program, "Bienestar," which was established in February 1987 to provide food and day care for Colombian's poorest children.

Personal life
Born as Mary Caroline Isakson on January 6, 1930 in York, Pennsylvania, Carolina Isakson Proctor, was a daughter of Carl Oscar Isakson and Mary Alice (née Proctor). At the time of her birth, her father, a Swedish American Engineer, was employed as an oil field worker in Tampico, Mexico. Shortly before her birth, her mother returned to the United States, according to a 1988 interview with The Philadelphia Inquirer:

"I have to tell you that I left York at 6 weeks old.... My mother came back to the States to have me and stayed with some friends in York."

When Mary Caroline Isakson was seven years old, her father relocated their family to Cúcuta, North Santander, to facilitate his work with the Colombian Petroleum Company.

She subsequently earned a bachelor's degree in Latin American Studies at Stanford University and a master's degree in Spanish Literature at Boston University, and met Virgilio Barco Vargas through his sister, her best friend and former classmate. Married to Virgilio on July 1, 1950 in Cúcuta, she was twenty years old at the time. Virgilio and Carolina had four children: María Carolina, Julia, Diana, and Virgilio, who were all educated, or worked in, the United States.

First Lady of Colombia
While serving as First Lady of Colombia, she helped to create "Bienestar," an anti-poverty program focused on improving the quality of life for Colombian children. Following the program's launch in February 1987, she was appointed as its director. Program personnel identified individual women in communities across Colombia who were each capable of caring for up to fifteen children, aged six months to seven years, in the women's respective homes. After working with each of those women to ensure that they had appropriate kitchen and bathroom facilities in their homes, and providing them with day care training, the program then paid the women salaries to care for the groups of children they were assigned, freeing up the mothers of those children to obtain employment, which, in turn, increased the standards of living of the families whose children were enrolled in the program. By March 1988, 120,000 children were receiving food via the program with planners hoping to increase that number to one million by 1990.

She also served as president of the board of directors of the Colombian Institute for Family Well-Being.

Death
Preceded in death by her parents and husband, she died on January 24, 2012 in Bogotá, D.C., Colombia.

See also
 Bertha Puga Martínez

References

1930 births
2012 deaths
Barco family
People from York, Pennsylvania
Burials at Central Cemetery of Bogotá
American emigrants to Colombia
American people of Swedish descent
American expatriates in Colombia
Naturalized citizens of Colombia
Colombian people of American descent
Colombian people of Swedish descent
Stanford University alumni
First ladies of Colombia